Malvern pudding is a traditional pudding from the English town of Malvern in Worcestershire. It is a baked dish made with apples or other seasonal fruit and custard although variations exist.

In 2010 it was listed as one of the ten most "threatened puddings" after a survey conducted by UKTV Food.

See also
 List of custard desserts

References 

British puddings
English cuisine
Custard desserts
Fruit dishes
Malvern, Worcestershire